Carl E. Stoffers, III (born October 18, 1975) is an American writer, editor, reporter, and former law enforcement officer. He has been the managing editor of IPVM, an investigative journalism outlet devoted to video surveillance, since September 7, 2021.

Early life and education
Stoffers was born in Livingston, New Jersey. He was raised primarily in Westfield, New Jersey where he resided with his paternal grandparents. Stoffers graduated from Westfield High School in 1993. He attended Union County College in Cranford, New Jersey.

After moving to Phoenix, Arizona in his late twenties, Stoffers was hired by the Arizona Department of Corrections and spent several years as a correctional officer at ASPC-Lewis.

Stoffers graduated summa cum laude from Kean University in Union, New Jersey in 2014 with a bachelor's degree in communication.

He graduated with honors from the Columbia University Graduate School of Journalism in 2015.

Career
Stoffers completed a post-graduate fellowship at The Marshall Project before being hired by the New York Daily News. His work has also been published in the Asbury Park Press, Bleacher Report, the Courier News, the Home News Tribune, The Independent, Newsweek, Vice, The Wall Street Journal, and other publications.

In June 2015, he was publicly criticized by Piper Kerman, author of the book-turned TV-series Orange is the New Black over a story he wrote that 'fact checked' the show's premier against his personal experiences as a correctional officer.

Based on his background as a journalist and former correctional officer, he was asked to speak at Princeton University's S.P.E.A.R. (Students for Prison Education and Reform) Conference in 2015. He lectured on how to overcome the police subculture and bring reform to the criminal justice system.

Stoffers was named associate editor of The New York Times Upfront in 2016.

Stoffers has been an adjunct faculty member at the Kean University School of Communication, Media and Journalism since 2017.

References

1975 births
Living people
Columbia University Graduate School of Journalism alumni
Kean University alumni
Kean University faculty
People from Livingston, New Jersey
People from Westfield, New Jersey
Writers from New Jersey
American reporters and correspondents
Union College (New Jersey) alumni
Westfield High School (New Jersey) alumni